The 2008 FIA GT Monza 2 Hours was the second round of the 2008 FIA GT Championship season.  It took place at Autodromo Nazionale Monza, Italy, on May 18, 2008.

The #61 Prospeed Competition Porsche was initially disqualified after winning the GT2 class due to a refueling infraction.  The team however appealed and their victory was reinstated.

Race results
Class winners in bold.  Cars failing to complete 75% of winner's distance marked as Not Classified (NC).  Cars with a C under their class are running in the Citation Cup, with the winner marked in bold italics.

Statistics
 Pole Position – #36 JetAlliance Racing – 1:49.258
 Average Speed – 190.10 km/h

References

Monza
FIA GT Monza